Mihai Rădulescu (born 24 July 1962) is a Romanian biathlete. He competed in the 20 km individual event at the 1984 Winter Olympics.

References

External links
 

1962 births
Living people
Romanian male biathletes
Olympic biathletes of Romania
Biathletes at the 1984 Winter Olympics
People from Vatra Dornei